Alessandro Renica (born 15 September 1962) is a former professional football player and former manager of Trissino. A former defender, he often played as either a sweeper or out of position as a full-back on occasion, and is mainly known for his time with Italian side Napoli, where he won several titles.

Playing career
Renica was born in Anneville-sur-Mer, France. Throughout his career, he played for L.R. Vicenza (1979–1982), Sampdoria (1982–1985), and Napoli (1985–1991), where he made a name for himself as key player in the club's starting line-up, winning several titles, before ending his career with Verona (1991–1993).

Style of play
A left-footed defender, Renica usually played as a sweeper, and was known for his vision, tactical sense, powerful left–foot, and his ability in the air, as well as leadership, correct behaviour, and honesty as a player.

Honours
Vicenza
 Coppa Italia Serie C: 1981–82

Sampdoria
 Coppa Italia: 1984–85

Napoli
 Serie A: 1986–87, 1989–90
 Coppa Italia: 1986–87
 Supercoppa Italiana: 1990
 UEFA Cup: 1988–89

References

External links
 Official FIGC Profile
 

1962 births
Living people
Sportspeople from Manche
Italian footballers
Footballers from Normandy
Footballers from Veneto
Association football defenders
Italy under-21 international footballers
UEFA Cup winning players
Serie A players
L.R. Vicenza players
U.C. Sampdoria players
S.S.C. Napoli players
Hellas Verona F.C. players
Italian football managers